Reginald Jack "Reg" Zeuner (born 18 January 1928) is a former Australian rules footballer who played for West Adelaide in the South Australian National Football League (SANFL) and Perth in the Western Australian National Football League (WANFL).

Career
Zeuner began his career with the West Adelaide colts team in 1945, and was promoted to the senior team in 1946. In 1947 he led West Adelaide's goalkicking with 53 goals, including five in the club's premiership victory over Norwood. In 1949 Zeuner transferred to WANFL side , where he played mainly as a forward, substituting as a ruckman when Merv McIntosh was unfit. He returned to Perth in 1954, and played in Perth's 1955 premiership victory, kicking two goals. Playing as Perth's main ruckman after the retirement of McIntosh before the 1956 season, Zeuner finished runner-up in the 1956 Sandover Medal to 's Graham Farmer. He later won Perth's best and fairest in 1958, before retiring at the end of the 1959 season. Zeuner also represented the WANFL as a forward at the 1950 Brisbane and 1953 Adelaide Carnivals, as well as one match in 1957. In 1999, he was selected as a reserve in Perth's Team of the Century.

References

1928 births
Australian rules footballers from South Australia
Living people
Sportspeople from Adelaide
Sportsmen from South Australia
Perth Football Club players
West Adelaide Football Club players